Carlos Gómez Álava, known as Carlos Gómez, is a Filipino writer in Spanish best known for his book of poems Excelsitudes. Nick Joaquin called him "the last Filipino writer in Spanish".

References

Spanish-language writers of the Philippines
20th-century Filipino poets
Writers from Bulacan
University of Santo Tomas alumni
Complutense University of Madrid alumni
Filipino male poets
1926 births
1988 deaths
20th-century male writers